Hagfish is the third and final studio album by the American rock band Hagfish, released in March 1998 on Honest Don's Records, a subsidiary label of Fat Wreck Chords. The album was reworked following a long delay with the band's previous label, London Records, who rejected the band's initial offering and eventually dropped the group. Bill Stevenson and Stephen Egerton would both reprise their roles as producers, having previously worked with the band on Rocks Your Lame Ass. An early version of "18 Days" (originally titled "New Year's Song") and a live version of "Twisting" previously appeared as b-sides to the "Happiness" promotional single in 1995. Alternate versions of "Hand" and "Agent 37" later appeared on the compilation album That Was Then, This Is Then in 2001.

Track listing
All songs written by George Stroud Reagan III and Hagfish except where noted.

 "Anniversary Song" – 2:26
 "Band" – 2:29
 "Envy" – 2:20
 "18 Days" – 1:05
 "Hand" – 2:35
 "Doo Doo Noggin" – 1:49
 "Bop" – 1:51
 "Closer" – 2:26
 "Sucker" – 2:56
 "Twisting" (John Flansburgh, John Linnell) – 1:48
 "Goes Down" – 1:33
 "Fruit" – 2:49
 "100% Woman" – 2:24
 "Alien" – 2:51
 "Agent 37" – 4:27

Personnel
George Stroud Reagan III – lead vocals
Zach Blair – guitar, backing vocals
Doni Blair – bass guitar
Tony Barsotti – drums, backing vocals
Additional personnel
Bill Stevenson – producer, mixer, engineer
Stephen Egerton – producer, mixer, engineer
Jason Livermore – engineer
Joe Gastwirt – mastering (Oceanview Mastering)
Jennifer Stevens – cover model
Blag Dahlia – photography
Melanie Grizzel – photography

References

Hagfish (band) albums
1998 albums
Honest Don's Records albums